Hajipur Nagar Parishad is the municipal organisation of Hajipur, India. Hajipur Nagar Parishad is the chief nodal agency for the administration of Hajipur.

History
Hajipur Nagar Parishad is oldest organisation in Hajipur city to overlook municipal work. Founded in 1869 as per District Gazette of Muzaffarpur.

Current structure 
It covers the entire Hajipur city in 45 wards. Currently the chairman (mayor) is Sangeeta Kumari the deputy chairman is Kanchan Kumari, the executive officer is Pankaj Kumar, .

References 

Hajipur